Zangalapalle railway station is located in Anantapur district in the Indian state of Andhra Pradesh and serves Zangalapalle village in Anantapur district. It lies on Guntakal–Bangalore section. It halts 8 trains Everyday.

History

The Guntakal–Bangalore line was opened in 1892–93. The metre-gauge Guntakal–Mysore Frontier Railway was opened in 1893. It was operated by Southern Mahrata Railway.

Electrification
The Gooty-Bangalore railway line is fully electrified and commissioned on 14 July 2016.

References

External links

Railway stations in Anantapur district
Guntakal railway division